1st class Active State Councillor of the Russian Federation is the highest federal state civilian service rank of Russia.

Overview
The rank of the 1st class Active State Councillor of the Russian Federation was first introduced with enactment of the Federal Law of 31 July 1995 No.119-FZ "About fundamentals of state service of Russian Federation" (as qualification class) and was retained with enactment of the Federal Law of 27 July 2004 No.79-FZ "About state civilian service of Russian Federation" (as state civilian service rank).

The rank is assigned by the President of Russia. It ranks immediately above 2nd class Active State Councillor of the Russian Federation.

According to the Table approved by the Presidential Decree of 1 February 2005 No.113, the rank of the 1st class Active State Councillor of the Russian Federation is equal to the military rank of the Army general/Fleet admiral.

Lists of persons
Below are links to lists of persons who were promoted to the rank of the 1st class Active State Councillor of the Russian Federation during five-year periods.

See also
 State civilian and municipal service ranks in Russian Federation

References

Federal state civilian service ranks in the Russian Federation